Xenohormesis is a hypothesis that posits that certain molecules such as plant polyphenols, which indicate stress in the plants, can have a longevity-conferring effect in consumers of plants (i.e. mammals) and studies that relationship. It was first used in the paper "Small molecules that regulate lifespan: evidence for xenohormesis" by David Sinclair and colleagues from the Harvard Medical School.

If the plants an animal is eating are under stress, their increased polyphenol content may signal forthcoming famine conditions. It could be advantageous for the animal to begin to react—i.e. to hunker down to prepare for the lean times to come. The effects researchers have observed from resveratrol may be just such a response.

See also
 Hormesis

References

Biological processes